The Weekend: Friday is an EP by American pop punk band Forever the Sickest Kids. It was released on November 17, 2009 worldwide through Universal Republic.

Background
The EP was originally intended to be a mini-LP, and was to be the first part of The Weekend series, with Saturday and Sunday following. However, as a large number of songs were written, the band decided to release a full-length self-titled album instead. On November 13, the band streamed the entire EP on their Myspace page.

The first single from the EP, "What Do You Want from Me", was originally released on October 30. A music video was later released on YouTube in late December.

The second single from the EP was "She Likes (Bittersweet Love)". In April 2010, the band had posted multiple teaser videos on their YouTube account in preparation for the release of the full music video for the song, which was later released on April 19. In May and June, the band went on the Bamboozle Road Show 2010 tour.

Track listing
All vocals by Jonathan Cook, Austin Bello, and Caleb Turman, except where noted.

Notes
"Do or Die" is a rewrite of the song "Stop Giving Your Love" by Been Bradley, the acoustic/electronic project Bello and Turman created before the formation of Forever the Sickest Kids.
Chae Hawk, who was featured in "Hawkbot", was previously featured in a remix of the band's song "Believe Me, I'm Lying", which was included as a track on the band's deluxe edition of their previous release, Underdog Alma Mater.

Personnel

Forever the Sickest Kids
 Jonathan Cook – vocals
 Austin Bello – bass guitar, vocals
 Caleb Turman – rhythm guitar, vocals
 Marc Stewart – lead guitar
 Kent Garrison – keyboards, synthesizers
 Kyle Burns – drums, percussion

Additional musicians
 Chae Hawk – guest vocals on "Hawkbot"

Production and artwork
 Tom Coyne – mastering
 Tom Lord-Alge – mixing
 Shep Goodman – A&R
 Kevin Ou – photography

References

2009 EPs
Forever the Sickest Kids albums
Albums produced by Matt Squire
Albums produced by Shep Goodman
Universal Republic Records albums